The 2017 Albanian Supercup was the 24th edition of the Albanian Supercup, an annual Albanian football match. The teams were decided by taking the winner of the previous season's Albanian Superliga and the winner of the Albanian Cup.

The match was contested by Kukësi, champions of the 2016–17 Albanian Superliga, and Tirana, the 2016–17 Albanian Cup winners. The match was held at Selman Stërmasi Stadium in Tiranë for the second consecutive year. and Tirana won the game 1–0. Tirana also set a record by becoming the first Albanian First Division side to win the Supercup. The game was broadcast through DigitAlb's SuperSport Albania.

Details

See also

2016–17 Albanian Superliga
2016–17 Albanian Cup

References

2017
Albanian Supercup, 2017
Albanian Supercup, 2017
Supercup